Gabriele Kuby (born 1944 in Konstanz, Germany) is a German writer and sociologist. She is a Catholic convert and noted for Traditionalist Catholic ideas and orthodox positions on sexuality and gender, which are stated in works like The Global Sexual Revolution: The Destruction of Freedom in the Name of Freedom. She also became known for criticizing the morality of the Harry Potter series.

Personal life
She is the daughter of Erich Kuby, sister of Clemens Kuby, and niece to Werner Heisenberg and E. F. Schumacher. Kuby is mother of three children, holds a degree in sociology earned at Berlin, and completed her master's degree in Konstanz.Her daughter, Sophia Kuby, a devout Catholic convert, is a pro-life activist and lobbyist since her own conversion in the year 2000.

References

External links 
Gabriele Kuby site

German women writers
German activists
German women activists
German anti-abortion activists
German Roman Catholics
German traditionalist Catholics
Converts to Roman Catholicism
1944 births
Living people